Dietmar Mürdter (born 4 October 1943 in Danzig) is a former professional German footballer.

Mürdter made two appearances in the Bundesliga during his playing career.

References

External links 
 

1943 births
Living people
Sportspeople from Gdańsk
German footballers
Association football forwards
Bundesliga players
1. FC Köln players
Bayer 04 Leverkusen players
Tennis Borussia Berlin players
People from West Prussia